Palame is a genus of beetles in the family Cerambycidae, containing the following species:

 Palame aeruginosa Monné, 1985
 Palame anceps (Bates, 1864)
 Palame crassimana Bates, 1864
 Palame mimetica Monné, 1985
 Palame vitticolle (Bates, 1864)

References

Acanthocinini